Brush Creek is a  tributary of Shaffer Creek in Bedford County, Pennsylvania, in the United States.

Brush Creek and Chapman Run join near Clearville to form Shaffer Creek.

See also
List of rivers of Pennsylvania

References

Rivers of Pennsylvania
Tributaries of the Juniata River
Rivers of Bedford County, Pennsylvania